Nenad Zivčević (born February 28, 1986) is a Macedonian and Serbian professional basketball player who plays for Kumanovo in Macedonian First League.

-The best scorer in 2017/2018 in Qatar league with 26ppg

-The best scorer in Bahrain 2018 with 31ppg

-The best scorer in Saudi Arabia 2020 with 33.3ppg

References

External links
  at eurobasket.com
  at realgm.com

1986 births
Living people
ABA League players
BC Politekhnika-Halychyna players
KK Budućnost players
KK Sloga players
Macedonian men's basketball players
Macedonian people of Serbian descent
Serbian men's basketball players
Serbian expatriate basketball people in Montenegro
Serbian expatriate basketball people in Egypt
Serbian expatriate basketball people in Sweden
Serbian expatriate basketball people in Ukraine
Serbian expatriate basketball people in Qatar
Serbian expatriate basketball people in Morocco
Serbian expatriate basketball people in Tunisia
Serbian expatriate basketball people in Saudi Arabia
Serbian expatriate basketball people in the United Arab Emirates
Sportspeople from Skopje
Power forwards (basketball)